The 1981 All-Pacific-10 Conference football team consists of American football players chosen by various organizations for All-Pacific-10 Conference teams for the 1981 NCAA Division I-A football season.

Offensive selections

Quarterbacks
 Mike Pagel, Arizona St.

Running backs
 Marcus Allen, USC 
 Darrin Nelson, Stanford 
 Gerald Riggs, Arizona St

Wide receivers
 Cormac Carney, UCLA
 Victor Simmons, Oregon St.

Tight ends
 Tim Wrightman, UCLA

Tackles
Luis Sharpe, UCLA
Harvey Salem, California

Guards
Roy Foster, USC
Bruce Matthews, USC

Centers
Tony Slaton, USC

Defensive selections

Linemen
Fletcher Jenkins, Washington
George Achica, USC
Dennis Edwards, USC
Matt Elisara, Washington St.

Linebackers
 Chip Banks, USC
Vernon Maxwell, Arizona St.
Mark Jerue, Washington
Ricky Hunley, Arizona

Defensive backs
 Mike Richardson, Arizona St.
 Paul Sorensen, Washington St.
Vaughn Williams, Stanford
Ray Horton, Washington

Special teams

Placekickers
Chuck Nelson, Washington

Punters
 Mike Black, Arizona St.

Return specialists 
Anthony Allen, Washington

Key

See also
1981 College Football All-America Team

References

All-Pacific-10 Conference Football Team
All-Pac-12 Conference football teams